Text & Talk: An Interdisciplinary Journal of Language, Discourse & Communication Studies is an academic journal published by Mouton de Gruyter. From 1981 through 1995, the journal was published under the name Text.

References

External links
 Text & Talk — official website

Publications established in 1981
Linguistics journals
De Gruyter academic journals
English-language journals